The Government of the Republic of Moldova allows citizens of specific countries/territories to visit Moldova for tourism or business purposes without having to obtain a visa, often based on bilateral agreements. Citizens of other countries must obtain a visa from the embassy of their residence country or online eVisa. All visitors must hold a passport (or machine-readable national ID Card for EU, Liechtensteiner, Monégasque, Sammarinese, Swiss and Turkish citizens) valid for 3 months beyond the period of intended stay.

Visa
The Moldovan visa is a document, which is placed in the passport. It contains the name and the indication of nationality.

Requirements for Tourist Visa
A tourist visa entitles its holder only to tourism trips and visits of relatives and/or friends. Tourist visa holders are prohibited to engage in business or work activities in the Republic of Moldova.

Requirements for Temporary Residence Visa/Work Visa
Anyone wishing to live and work in Moldova will be required to apply for a temporary residence visa. To obtain a temporary visa for employment purposes, you will need to secure a job offer from a Moldovan company or government department, or a foreign company based in Moldova. The criteria for approval of an employment visa include suitable educational qualifications or work experience, a secured employment contract in Moldova, provide proof of adequate means of subsistence in Moldova, police confirmation that you have no criminal record, and a satisfactory medical examination. All official documents must be translated into the Romanian language.

Visa policy map

Visa exemption
Citizens of the following 104 countries and territories, as well as stateless persons and refugees residing in those countries, can enter the Republic of Moldova without a visa for a period of up to 90 days within any 180 day period.

 1 — may enter with a machine-readable national ID card (including Irish passport card)

Substitute visa

Citizens of visa-required countries are allowed to visit Moldova without a Moldovan visa if they hold a valid residence permit, a valid 'C'-type, or a valid 'D'-type visa issued by a Schengen member state or a European Union member state.

However, this policy does not apply to passport holders of the following countries and territories:

Invitation letter required
Nationals of the following countries are required to provide an invitation letter in order to obtain a visa for Moldova:

Anyone, regardless of nationality, having a valid visa or a residence permit issued by an EU/Schengen State, is exempted from the invitation letter requirement.

Non-ordinary passports
Additionally, only holders of diplomatic or official/service passports of China, Indonesia, Iran, Qatar, Turkmenistan and Vietnam do not require a visa to visit Moldova.

Reciprocity

Moldovan citizens can enter many of the countries whose citizens are granted visa-free access to Moldova without a visa except for Argentina, Australia, Brazil, Canada, Costa Rica, El Salvador, Grenada (grants visa on arrival), Guatemala, Hong Kong, Honduras, Ireland, Japan, Kiribati, Lebanon, Marshall Islands, Mexico, Nicaragua (grants visa on arrival), New Zealand, Palau (grants visa on arrival), Paraguay, Saint Lucia, Singapore (grants eVisa), Solomon Islands, South Korea, Tonga, Trinidad and Tobago, Tuvalu (grants visa on arrival), United Arab Emirates, United Kingdom, United States, Uruguay, Vanuatu and Venezuela.

Visitor statistics
Most visitors arriving to Moldova were from the following countries of nationality:

See also

Visa policy of Transnistria
Visa requirements for Moldovan citizens

References

External links
 Visas to Moldova

Foreign relations of Moldova
Moldova